Lieutenant-Colonel The Honourable Douglas George Carnegie (4 January 1870 – 27 February 1937) was a British politician who was Conservative Member of Parliament for Winchester from 1916 to 1918.

Early life
He was the son of Lieutenant-Colonel George Carnegie, 9th Earl of Northesk and Elizabeth Georgina Frances Elliot.

Career
Carnegie was commissioned into the 3rd (Militia) Battalion, Gloucestershire Regiment in 1888. He resigned his commission as a major in 1905. From 1917 to 1918 he served with the Labour Corps and was promoted lieutenant-colonel.

From 1916 to 1918, he served as a Conservative Member of Parliament for Winchester.

Personal life
He married Margaret Jean Johnstone-Douglas, daughter of Arthur Henry Johnstone-Douglas and Jane Maitland Stewart, on 26 April 1894. Together, they lived at Fair Oak, Rogate, Sussex, and had four children:

 John Douglas Carnegie, 12th Earl of Northesk (1895–1975), who married Dorothy Mary Campion, daughter of the Governor of Western Australia, Col. Sir William Robert Campion, and Katherine Mary Byron (a granddaughter of George Byron, 7th Baron Byron), in 1920.
 David Alexander Carnegie (1897–1917), who was killed in action during World War I.
 Lady Jean Douglas Carnegie (b. 1899), who married Lt.-Col. James David Bibby, son of Alfred Bibby.
 Margaret Carnegie (1901–1946), who died unmarried.

Carnegie died on 27 February 1937. In 1963, his eldest son John succeeded his nephew David to become the 12th Earl of Northesk.

References

External links 
 

1870 births
1937 deaths
Gloucestershire Regiment officers
Conservative Party (UK) MPs for English constituencies
UK MPs 1910–1918
British Militia officers
Royal Pioneer Corps officers
Younger sons of earls